The Project 670 Skat submarine (NATO classification Charlie class) was a nuclear-powered cruise missile submarine built for the Soviet Navy and later operated by the Russian Navy. All Charlie I/II-class submarines are decommissioned. One Charlie-class submarine was used for testing an Oniks missile. Charlie I and its successor Charlie II-class submarines are designed by the Lazurit Central Design Bureau of Gorky.

Background
The Charlie I-class submarine (Project 670 Skat) SSGN was first launched at the Krasnoye Sormovo inland shipyard at Gorkiy in 1967 with another ten following over a period of five years. The Charlie Is had two banks of four missile tubes angled upwards on each side of the bow outside the pressure hull. The tubes were covered by large outer doors and the design was to incorporate the P-120 Malakhit (SS-N-9 Siren) medium-range anti-ship missile. Due to delays in the missile development, the missile was substituted with the shorter range P-70 Ametist (SS-N-7 Starbright) submerged launch missile which itself was a development of the P-15 Termit (SS-N-2 Styx) surface-launched missile. The missiles were designed for pop up surprise attacks on high value surface targets such as aircraft carriers.

In 1972 to 1979, six improved units called the Project 670M Skat-M (Charlie II class) were built. The improved Charlie IIs were built at Gorkiy with an  insert in the hull forward of the fin. The insert incorporated electronics and launch systems for targeting and firing of the longer range P-120 Malakhit anti-ship missile.

The Charlie Is and IIs returned to port for reload once they had expended their missile payloads. However, the Charlie classs secondary armament of torpedoes and sonar systems provided useful anti-ship and anti-submarine warfare capabilities in addition to their missile launch capabilities.

The last Charlie was retired in 1994. While still operational, one unit of the class was leased to the Indian Navy between 1988 and 1991, mainly for India to gain experience in the operations of a nuclear submarine.

Boats
 11 Project 670 (Charlie I) submarines were built between 1968 and 1973. K-43 was leased to the Indian Navy as Chakra from 1988 to 1992.  sank near Petropavlovsk-Kamchatsky in 1983 with 16 fatalities, but was raised and used as a harbour training hulk. On 13 September 1985,  sank at her moorings.  She was again raised and decommissioned.
 6 Project 670M (Charlie II) submarines were built between 1973 and 1980.

All boats were scrapped between 1990 and 1994.

References

Further reading

External links
 Article in Russian from Encyclopedia of Ships
 Article in Russian
 Page in English from FAS

Submarine classes
 
Russian and Soviet navy submarine classes
Nuclear submarines of the Soviet Navy